Héctor Illueca Ballester (born 8 August 1975) is a Spanish labour inspector and politician. He served as Director of the Labour and Social Security Inspectorate from February 2020 to September 2021.

Previously, he served as member of the 13th and 14th Congress of Deputies within the Confederal Unidas Podemos-En Comú Podem-Galicia en Común Parliamentary Group.

Biography 
Born on 8 August 1975 in Valencia, he earned a PhD in Law at the University of Valencia (UV).

In 2018, he co-authored along  and Julio Anguita a series of provocative pieces directing criticism towards the European Union while defending several measures taken by the Italian government of coalition between the Northern League and Five Star Movement that subsequently set a fierce intellectual controversy within the Spanish left-wing public sphere.

He ran as candidate to the Congress of Deputies vis-à-vis the 2019 general election, 1st in the Unidas Podemos list in the constituency of Valencia; he was elected and became a member of the 13th Congress of Deputies, joining the Confederal Unidas Podemos-En Comú Podem-Galicia en Común Parliamentary Group. On 30 July 2019 he was elected to chair the Committee on Labour, Migrations and Social Security of the Congress of Deputies.

On 21 January 2020, the labour minister Yolanda Díaz appointed him as Director-General of the Labour and Social Security Inspectorate, withdrawing from his position as member of parliament. He was sworn in on 3 February 2020.

Works 
 Coauthored books

References 

1975 births
Living people
Members of the 13th Congress of Deputies (Spain)
Members of the 14th Congress of Deputies (Spain)
Podemos (Spanish political party) politicians
University of Valencia alumni
Politicians from the Valencian Community